Bruhnsøya is a small island in Kong Ludvigøyane, an island group in Thousand Islands, an archipelago south of Edgeøya. The island is named after the German astronomer Carl Christian Bruhns (1830–81).

References

 Norwegian Polar Institute Place Names of Svalbard Database

Islands of Svalbard